Callitris baileyi is a species of conifer in the family Cupressaceae. It is found only in Australia, more specifically Southeast Queensland. Its common English name is Bailey's cypress-pine. The name is dedicated to Australian botanist Frederick Manson Bailey, who was the first to collect specimens of this tree. Bailey's name is closely associated with much of the flora of Queensland and their elucidation in Southeastern Queensland. Over the past few decades the conifer has been severely threatened by habitat loss Fruiting for the species has been recorded year-round.

Description 
Callitris baileyi is a slender tree growing to a height of 18m with rough greyish looking bark, and with a green crown. The adult leaves are green with an average size of 25 mm long. They have an arrangement of groups of three leaves that run parallel with the stem. While the branchlets have an appearance of being grooved due to the base of the leaves running down the stem as a wing. Cones form on slender fruiting branchlets that are solitary from one another. Both the male and female cones form on the same tree. With the male cones appearing on the end of branchlets at a size of 2-3mm long. While the female cones form on a branchlet that have a waxy, greyish-blue coloring during its development. The female cone is oblong in shape and measure a size of 10-13mm in diameter. The cones are covered in scales that alternate and are short and narrow. The central stalk of the cone is short, narrow at the base and slightly angled. The seeds that get produced are few in number, with only two unequal wings.

Range and habitat 

Callitris baileyi is found in Southeast Queensland, Australia sporadically. With more than ten known locations ranging from places like the state border of Southeast Queensland, to Goomeri in northern Australia, and as far west as the Bunya Mountains range. However, there has been some smaller patches of subpopulations found in private lands such as the Koreelah National Park which is west of Woodenbong. These subpopulations have been severely fragmented due to widespread habitat fragmentation throughout its range

Callitris baileyi was once found in Acacia Creek and Sandilands near Tabulam in New South Wales, however, now it ceases to occupy that area.

Callitris baileyi is a terrestrial plant system, that grows on rocky slopes, hilly or mountainous areas, in shallow and often clay soils. At an extent of occurrence between 15,000 and 25,000 km2. It is found in eucalypt woodland, commonly associated with Ironbark, Blue Gum and Spotted Gum trees. Compared to the New South Wales sub-population that emerges in open grassy eucalypt forest near creeks.

Habitat decline and conservation  
Over the years the population of Callitris baileyi has been in decline to the point of Near Threatened (IUCN 3.1) status. This has largely been due to inappropriate fire regimes, which is the act of frequent low-intensity burning to reduce fuel loads. This method is used to promote grass growth for cattle grazing or agriculture, which over time prevents regeneration and can lead to the elimination of the species subpopulations. This type of fragmentation of the species is becoming more prevalent outside of national parks.

Another factor into the species habitat decline is the invasion by alien invasive weeds in a limited part of its range is inferred. Alien invasive weeds such as Lantana camara are a problem in some parts of its range in Queensland.

Recent conservation efforts have been made by the New South Wales state legislation to list the species as Endangered, while in the state of Queensland, Australia has it listed as Near Threatened. The Callitris baileyi has been recorded in several national parks such as the Bunya Mountains National Park in Queensland and Koreelah National Park in New South Wales.

References

baileyi
Pinales of Australia
Trees of Australia
Vulnerable flora of Australia
Nature Conservation Act rare biota
Vulnerable biota of Queensland
Rare flora of Australia
Flora of Queensland
Taxonomy articles created by Polbot